CCAV may refer to:

 Chinese Internet slang for China Central Television
 Chinese Consumers' Association of Vancouver
 Centre for Connected and Autonomous Vehicles